Parliamentary elections were held in Finland on 21 March 1999. Despite suffering significant losses, the Social Democratic Party (SDP) remained the largest party of the Eduskunta and Paavo Lipponen remained Prime Minister.

Background
Prime Minister Paavo Lipponen's five-party "rainbow government" consisting of the SDP, National Coalition Party, Left Alliance, Swedish People's Party and the Green League had been in power since April 1995. It had managed to keep Finland's economy growing, to reduce the state's budget deficit and to create jobs, although it had failed to halve the unemployment rate:  in 1995, the unemployment had been 15.4% and in 1999, it still stood at 10.2%.  This was, as the governing parties pointed out, still a better record than the previous centre-right government's performance; during its term between 1991 and 1995, the unemployment had risen from 6.6% to 15.4%.

Campaign
The largest opposition party, the Centre Party, tried to become the largest party overall, and to re-join the government. They called for labour reform, which they claimed would make it easier for employers to hire new employees and for small enterprises to operate.  Finland's largest labour unions rejected the proposed work reform, claiming that it would reduce the employees' job security and would excessively increase the employers' power.  The Centrists also accused the government of not improving the Finnish economy enough, and of not slowing down sufficiently the large internal migration of Finns from the rural towns and small cities to the large economic growth centres, like the Helsinki and Tampere regions.

Several parties hired as their candidates previously non-political or only locally politically active celebrities, such as Leena Harkimo, the manager of Helsinki's ice hockey team Jokerit, Lasse Virén, a former long-distance running Olympic champion, and Anni Sinnemäki, the songwriter of pop music group Ultra Bra.  Some of these celebrities got elected.  After the elections, Prime Minister Lipponen formed a new government of the same five parties.  Only one of those parties left the government during the parliamentary term 1999-2003:  the Greens moved into the opposition in May 2002, when the Parliament approved the construction of Finland's fifth nuclear power plant.

Results

By Province

References

General elections in Finland
Finland
Parliament
Finland
Election and referendum articles with incomplete results